Nemacerota tancrei is a moth in the family Drepanidae. It was described by Ludwig Carl Friedrich Graeser in 1888. It is found in the Russian Far East, the Korean Peninsula, Japan and China (Heilongjiang, Jilin, eastern Inner Mongolia).

References

Moths described in 1888
Thyatirinae